Eoin Waide is an Irish Gaelic footballer who plays for Naomh Conaill and also, formerly, for the Donegal county team.

In 2005, Waide played for his club in the final of the Donegal Senior Football Championship. He also played for his club in the final of the 2010 Donegal Senior Football Championship. He then played for his club in the final of the 2015 Donegal Senior Football Championship. His team won all three games.

He also played for his club in the final of the 2020 Donegal Senior Football Championship. They won, following extra-time and a penalty shoot-out.

He played for Donegal Boston in 2008.

Waide captained Donegal in the final and scored three points as the team won their first Ulster minor title in 10 years at Croke Park in 2006. In 2009, he made substitute appearances for the Donegal senior team in the second halves of their championship victory over Galway at Markievicz Park and their defeat to Cork at Croke Park. He was injured in 2012.

References

Year of birth missing (living people)
Living people
Donegal Boston Gaelic footballers
Donegal inter-county Gaelic footballers
Irish expatriate sportspeople in the United States
Naomh Conaill Gaelic footballers